Nima is a Zongo residential town in the Greater Accra Region of Ghana. The town is popular because of its market – the Nima market. The name Nima has its etymology from the Ga Language which literally means the "city of the King". Nii means King in the Ga language, while the word city in the same language is mann. There have been a few contrasting views about the name, however, with some pointing to the town's Muslim community to say Nima was a reference to the Arabic word, "Ni'ma", which means blessings.

Nima is considered the largest and one of the oldest Zongo communities in Ghana with origins as far back as 1836. The settlement is often referred to as one-half of the twin community, Mamobi-Nima, though it is mostly used to refer to the two adjoining towns. Nima is a Muslim-dominated area. Like most Zongo communities, though, it exhibits great diversity in religion and ethnicity (dominated by the Dogon people of Mali, also known as Kaado or kardo). One of the largest churches, The Church of Pentecost, is located along the main highway.

Origin 
The history of Nima is contested by many. One of the dominant stories is that the area was acquired from the Osus by the Odoi Kwaos with intentions to farm. Some time later, though, it is believed the Odoi Kwaos offered the land to Malam Amadu Futa to be used as a settlement for strangers. The Futa family are, therefore, considered the founders of Nima.

Economy 

Nima and its environs developed as a settlement for traders from the northern regions of Ghana and those from neighbouring countries such as Togo and Burkina Faso. It is a major trading hub in the capital. The Nima Market, known locally as Kasoa Mamudu, is one of the largest and busiest markets in Accra; it's located along the Al-Waleed Bin Talal Highway. Wednesdays are market days, and the market is bustling with traders dealing in cereals, grains, vegetables, and livestock. The Nima Market is a great destination for spice lovers. It also has a number of vendors dealing in traditional medicines. People looking for fowls with unique or single colours for special rites often visit the Nima Market to make their selection. The streets leading to the market from Mamobi are lined with shops selling groceries and fashion items. There is also a huge contingency of forex traders on the street, with many black market sellers operating on both sides of the street.

Shooting 
Main article : Nima-Mamobi gang violence

On 18 January 2022, a violent clash took place between two rival groups at Nima and Mamobi. Members of the gangs were seen on video shooting at each other with others holding cutlasses and clubs. About seven people were arrested by the Ghana Police Service. GHS20,000 bounty were placed on the heads of the two gang leaders Kumordzi and Bombom and were declared wanted. Farouk Daudi was arrested by the Police in collaboration with the National Investigation Bureau for his involvement in the clash.

Condemnation 
Nafis Quaye who is a youth activist and the president of World Youth Opportunity condemned the violence calling it 'unproductive and destructive.'

References

Populated places in the Greater Accra Region